Dr. Reza Khodadadi (Persian in رضا خدادادی born Ardabil) (born 26 February 1961) is an Iranian contemporary artist, academic, painter, sculptor, urban artist, and muralist. He has a PhD in Art Research; and is a Professor of Art at the Tehran University of Art and the President of Farabi International Campus. He lives and works in Tehran.

He is the author of Mural Techniques book and another eight books in the field of public art and murals, titled Rules and Regulations Urban Beautification.

Books
"Mural Techniques" Publisher: Sepand Minooand and the Beautification Organization of Tehran
" Urban Rules and Regulations of the Beautification, volume 21: Ideation, Drawing and Implementation of Murals" Publisher: Sepand Minoo and the Beautification Organization of Tehran
" Urban Rules and Regulations of the Beautification, volume 22: Mosaic Murals" Publisher: Sepand Minoo and the Beautification Organization of Tehran
" Urban Rules and Regulations of the Beautification, volume, 23: MOARAQ Murals " Publisher: Sepand Minooand and the Beautification Organization of Tehran
" Urban Rules and Regulations of the Beautification, volume 24: HAFT RANG (Painted Tile) Murals" Publisher: Sepand Minooand and the Beautification Organization of Tehran
" Urban Rules and Regulations of the Beautification, volume 25: Broken Tile Murals " Publisher: Sepand Minooand and the Beautification Organization of Tehran
" Urban Rules and Regulations of the Beautification, volume 26: Clay Relife Murals" Published by: Sepand Minooand and the Beautification Organization of Tehran
" Urban Rules and Regulations of the Beautification, volume 27:"Stone Relief Murals " Publisher: Sepand Minooand and the Beautification Organization of Tehran
" Urban Rules and Regulations of the Beautification, volume 28: Concrete Murals" Publisher: Sepand Minoo and the Beautification Organization of Tehran
The Scientific Observer the Book of "Urban Furniture Coloring Guide", Urban Rules and Regulations of the Beautification, the Beautification Organization of Tehran
The Scientific Observer the Book of "Preparing the pre-Painting Surfaces" Urban Rules and Regulations of the Beautification. the Beautification Organization of Tehran
The scientific observer of the book "Applying the cover in painting the surfaces" Urban Rules and Regulations of the Beautification, the Beautification Organization of Tehran.

Research projects
Research project study "Art Events of Iran in Calendar ", University of Art Complex (Art University) 1990
Application research project "Design and Manufacturing of "Bafg / Bandar Abbas Railway", Ministry of Railways,1994
Application research project for "Design and Manufacturing of the "Mashhad / Sarakhs Railways", Ministry of Roads of the Railway Administration, 1996
Application research project "Design and Manufacturing of "Karkheh dam" with pneumatic movable components - Ministry of Energy / Karkhe Dam 1999-2000
"Design and Manufacturing "Contemporary Indian Art ", Institute of Visual Arts / Tehran Museum of Contemporary Arts 2000
Research project study “ Murals of Tehran: musts and musts not”, The Beautification Organization of Tehran, 2013
Author several scientific articles and essays.
Various lectures at universities and scientific and cultural centers.
Judging and evaluating of research projects, articles and books.

Associations
Secretary of the “New Thought Segment” the Tehran Beautification Organization.
Member of Iranian Association of Official Experts
Expert of Association of Official in Art affairs Member of Iranian Association of Official Experts
Honorary Member of Institute for Promotion of Contemporary Visual Art, Iran.
Member of Scientific Committee and Jury of 2nd Iranian Lighting Design Conference and Professional Lighting Convention.
Member of Scientific Committee and Jury of the 23rd International Exhibition of Home Furniture.(Tehran International Permanent Fairground).
Member of Jury “The first National Award for Best Furniture ”(PFN AWARD 2014).

Exhibitions
He has had several solo exhibitions in Golestan Gallery, Barg Gallery, Haft Samar Gallery, Mah Art Gallery, Hoor Art Gallery and Boom Art Gallery. He has participated in over 140 domestic and foreign collective exhibitions. He has 25 paintings, sculptures and reliefs in museums.

See also
 Islamic art
 Iranian art
 Islamic calligraphy
 List of Iranian artists

References

External links

boom gallery
saatchionline
pictify Biography, Selected Works
art-3000Biography, Selected Works 
absolutearts
Mah Art Gallery 
iransculpture.ir
 blackbook.ir

1961 births
Living people
Abstract painters
Contemporary painters
Iranian painters
Iranian contemporary artists
Academic staff of Tehran University of Art
Iranian sculptors
People from Ardabil